Fowler High School may refer to:
 George Fowler High School (New York)
 Fowler High School (Colorado)
 Fowler High School (Michigan)
 Fowler High School (California)